HD 194012 (HR 7793; Gliese 789) is a star in the equatorial constellation Delphinus. It has an apparent magnitude of 6.15, making it visible to the naked eye under ideal conditions.

HD 194012 has a stellar classification of F7 V, indicating that it is an ordinary F-type main-sequence star. HD 194012's metallicity is calculated to be 87% that of the Sun.

HD 194012 has been examined for infrared excess suggesting a debris disk but none was found.

References

Delphinus (constellation)
F-type main-sequence stars
High-proper-motion stars
BD+14 04275
0789
100511
194012
7793